Belgian Revenge (French:La revanche belge) is a 1922 Belgian silent film directed by Théo Bergerat and starring Fernand Crommelynck. War drama about a woman hero, in love with a military engineer and coveted by his odious collaborationist "krauts" . She does not give in to the blackmail of a German who is lying to her about her fiancé's alleged death. The only remnant of the Belgian production of the Frenchman Bergerat.

Cast
 Fernand Crommelynck as René Forgeois 
 Bella Darms as Hélène Forestier 
 Coursière as Ingénieur Forestier 
 Jimmy O'Kelly as Paul Forgeois 
 Varenne as Fritz Bauer

References

Bibliography
 Philippe Rège. Encyclopedia of French Film Directors, Volume 1. Scarecrow Press, 2009.

External links 
 

1922 films
1920s French-language films
Films directed by Théo Bergerat
Films set in Belgium
Belgian black-and-white films